James Hamilton (born 14 June 1954) was a Scottish professional footballer who played as a midfielder for Sunderland.

External links 
 Aussie Footballers Hadley to Haragli

References

1955 births
Living people
People from Baillieston
Footballers from Glasgow
Scottish footballers
Association football midfielders
West Bromwich Albion F.C. players
Sunderland A.F.C. players
Plymouth Argyle F.C. players
Bristol Rovers F.C. players
Carlisle United F.C. players
Greenock Morton F.C. players
Gretna F.C. players
Hartlepool United F.C. players
Queen of the South F.C. players
English Football League players
Newcastle KB United players
APIA Leichhardt FC players
Canberra City FC players